Emmanuel von Schimonsky (1752-1832) was Prince-Bishop of Wrocław from 1823 to 1832.

Early life
Emmanuel von Schimonsky was born on July 23, 1752, in Brzeźnica, the son of alderman Joseph von Schimonsky. He studied in Wroclaw, and later at the Lateran in  Rome where he was ordained in 1775. He returned to Silesia and was a pastor in Tany near a Koźla. At the same time, he served as dean and episcopal commissioner.

In 1793 he became a canon and  vicar general of the diocese of Wroclaw, and in 1797AD an auxiliary bishop. In 1817 AD he was appointed by Pope Pius VII administrator of the bishopric. In 1823 he became bishop of the diocese of Wroclaw. He died on 27 December 1832AD.

A conservative, he fought the effects of the French Revolution in the form of Josephinism and teachings of the Enlightenment amid a backdrop  of changing relationships between the Church, the Roman Curia and the Prussian government. He died on December 27, 1832, in Wrocław.

References

Sources 

1752 births
1832 deaths
19th-century Roman Catholic bishops in Poland
Bishops of Wrocław